Barbantus is a genus of tubeshoulders.

Species
There are currently two recognized species in this genus:
 Barbantus curvifrons (Roule & Angel, 1931) (Palebelly searsid)
 Barbantus elongatus G. Krefft, 1970

References

Platytroctidae
Ray-finned fish genera
Marine fish genera
Taxa named by Albert Eide Parr